Sarstangen is a point on the island of Prins Karls Forland in Svalbard, Norway. It is located east of Forlandsrevet and north of Sarsbukta. It is named after Michael Sars.

References

Peninsulas of Svalbard
Prins Karls Forland